Strike Up the Band is a 1927 musical with a book by Morrie Ryskind, lyrics by Ira Gershwin and music by George Gershwin. It first ran as a satirical show in Philadelphia that year, unsuccessfully, and on Broadway in 1930 after the original book by George S. Kaufman was revised by Ryskind. The show concerned a cheese manufacturer who sponsors a war against Switzerland because it will be named after him. Much of the satire of the 1927 version was replaced in the new version by silliness, leading Ryskind to recall, "What I had to do, in a sense, was to rewrite War and Peace for the Three Stooges."

Aside from the title tune, the 1940 Judy Garland-Mickey Rooney musical film Strike Up the Band had no relation to the stage production.

The overture is often performed as a stand-alone concert work.

Libretto
The original book by George S. Kaufman centered on Horace J. Fletcher, a Babbitt-like cheese tycoon who tries to maintain his monopoly on the American market by convincing the United States government to declare war on Switzerland.  The story ended darkly.

The 1930 plot by Ryskind, softened the political overtones, increased the emphasis on romance and added a happy ending.  It relegated the war plot to a dream sequence.  The incident that incites war concerned chocolate instead of cheese.

1927

Act 1
Workers at the Horace J. Fletcher American Cheese Company sing their daily vocal exercises ("Fletcher's American Cheese Choral Society") to start the day and greet the foreman Timothy Harper, manager C. Edgar Sloan, and owner Horace J. Fletcher.  Fletcher is pleased with the President signing a new bill imposing a fifty percent tariff on imported cheese.  Mrs. Draper arrives to ask Fletcher to do charitable work with her in order to get close to him.  Her daughter Anne goes to meet Timothy, though her mother disapproves of the relationship ("17 and 21").  Fletcher receives news that someplace called "Switzerland" has sent a telegram protesting the tariff.  Fletcher tells Sloane to send a messenger to the hotel of Colonel Holmes, the President's adviser.  Mr. Fletcher's daughter Joan enters and wants him to handle James Townsend, a reporter who wrote an article calling her a snob.  After she leaves, Townsend arrives to interview Fletcher about Switzerland's response to the tariff.

Production
During its original 1927 pre-Broadway tryouts, the political satire closed in Philadelphia, fulfilling original librettist's George S. Kaufman's definition of satire as "what closes on Saturday night."  The original is heavily influenced by Gilbert and Sullivan.

The Gershwins revised the story with Ryskind for the 1930 Broadway run; they also removed the song The Man I Love, now a Gershwin standard, from the show.  They added a dozen new songs and rewrote the lyrics or changed the melodies of many of the 1927 songs.  The new score is less Gilbert-and-Sullivan and more swing-influenced.  Directed by Alexander Leftwich and choreographed by George Hale, the revised production opened on Broadway at the Times Square Theatre on January 14, 1930, and closed on June 28, 1930, after a moderately successful run of 191 performances. The cast included Dudley Clements and Blanche Ring.

Score
The Gershwins' first fully integrated score for a book musical was influenced by the operettas of Gilbert and Sullivan. The pit band was the Red Nichols Orchestra, which included Benny Goodman, Glenn Miller, Gene Krupa, Jimmy Dorsey, and Jack Teagarden.

The overture is often performed alone as a concert work.

The title song, "Strike Up the Band", was given to the University of California, Los Angeles by the Gershwins in 1936 as "Strike Up the Band for UCLA" and has become one of the school songs.

In 1990, a studio cast recording of the original 1927 score (and some of the 1930 songs), featuring Rebecca Luker, Brent Barrett, Beth Fowler and Don Chastain, was released on the Nonesuch label.  At the same time, the 1930 version was recorded with the same cast but not released.  This recording was finally released in 2011 by PS Classics.

1927 song list

Overture
Act I
Fletcher's American Cheese Choral Society
17 And 21
Typical Self-Made American
Meadow Serenade
Unofficial Spokesman
Patriotic Rally
The Man I Love
Yankee Doodle Rhythm
17 And 21 (Reprise)
Act I Finaletto
Strike Up the Band

Act II
Oh This Is Such A Lovely War
Hoping That Someday You'd Care
Come-Look-At-The-War
Military Dancing Drill
How About A Man?
Act II Finaletto
Homeward Bound/The Girl I Love (Reprise of The Man I Love)
The War That Ended War
Finale Ultimo

1930 song list

Overture
Act I
Fletcher's American Chocolate Choral Society
I Mean to Say
Typical Self-Made American
Soon
A Man of High Degree
The Unofficial Spokesman
Three Cheers for the Union
This Could Go On For Years
If I Became President
Soon (Reprise)
(What's the Use of) Hanging Around with You?
He Knows Milk
Strike Up the Band

Act II
In the Rattle of the Battle
Military Dancing Drill
Mademoiselle from New Rochelle
I've Got a Crush on You
(How About a Boy) Like Me?
Official Resume
Ring a Ding Dong Bell (Ding Dong)

Arrangements
Music from Strike Up the Band has frequently been re-arranged for performance by different types of musical ensembles.

Don Rose, using Gershwin's original score and notes, augmented the orchestration of the overture to facilitate a performance by a full symphony orchestra (which features more players than a traditional pit orchestra). This version is the one commonly performed by symphony orchestras.

Luther Henderson and Sammy Nestico  created arrangement for Brass ensemble.  Désiré Dondeyne  made an arrangement for wind Orchestra, Warren Barker  for Concert band.  Martin Caron, member of Duo Caron did a transcription for formation four pianists-eight hands.   Also note Gerry Mulligan, Mark Hayes (Choir arrangement) and Carl Strommen (Arrangement for wind instruments). Soon was included in a Gershwin ballad medley recorded by the Modern Jazz Quartet.

References

External links
Internet Broadway Database entry
Playbill review
 Strike Up the Band at the Music Theatre International website

1927 musicals
Broadway musicals
Recordings of music by George Gershwin
Culture of New Rochelle, New York
Musicals by George and Ira Gershwin